Badshahi Angti (English title : The Emperor's Ring) is a novel by Satyajit Ray featuring the private detective Feluda. This novel was first serialized in Sandesh magazine in the year 1966–1967. It was then released in book form in 1969 by Ananda Publishers. This is the first Feluda novel created by Satyajit Ray.

Plot outline
Feluda along with Topshe and Topshe's father decide to visit Dhirendra Kumar Sanyal (or Dhiru Kaka, as called by Topshe), who lives in Lucknow. Feluda now works for a bank. They reach Dhiru Kaka's house. In the evening, while having tea, they have a visitor named Dr. Srivastav, who is an osteopath and a good friend of Dhiru Kaka. Dr. Srivastav tells Dhiru Kaka that last night a daku or a dacoit had broken into his house. He believes that the dacoit must have come to rob a precious ring given to him by Pyarelal Seth, because he had saved the life of his only son. He further tells that when Pyarelal had his second heart-attack, Pyarelal tried to tell Srivastav something. He said - a spy ... .a spy ... . Then he died. Dr. Srivastav tells that robberies do not happen much in his neighborhood due to the presence of Bonobihari Sarkar, who owns a private menagerie with various poisonous animals.  Dhiru Kaka tells Feluda that the ring once belonged to the Mughal emperor Aurangzeb. Dhiru Kaka offers to keep the ring with him. Later, when Dr. Srivastav leaves the house, Feluda sees a car following the doctor's car. Feluda tells Topshe that somebody had been listening to their conservation, because Feluda finds a half-burnt cigarette in the garden.

Next day, Feluda, Topshe, his father and Dhiru Kaka go to the Imambara. There, they find Bonobihari Sarkar, who invites them to his private zoo. In the Bhoolbhulaia (The Labyrinth), Feluda was keeping close to the wall. In the roof of the Imambara, they find a man. Dhiru Kaka introduces him as Mahavir Seth, the son of Pyarelal. In the evening, they come to Mr. Sarkar's house. There they see three of the most poisonous creatures - rattle snake, a blue scorpion and a Black Widow Spider. There they meet Mr. Sarkar's assistant, Ganesh Guha. They also learn that Mr. Sarkar knows about the ring. When they came back to Dhiru Kaka's house, his servant informs him that a sadhu baba was waiting for him. He left a while ago. Dhiru Kaka rushes to the cupboard where he kept the ring but he finds that there is no ring. Feluda and Topshe rush out to find the sadhu baba, but to no success. While coming back to the house, someone throws a rolled up paper on Feluda. But Feluda could not catch him.

Feluda later tells Topshe that the paper warns Feluda to stop investigating. He also learns from Dr. Srivastav that Mahavir is an actor. Feluda also shows a tin of toothpowder to Topshe. When Topshe enquires what is the use of this, Feluda tells that it is Churnikrito Brahmastra. That night, someone tries to make Feluda and Topshe unconscious by using chloroform. But Topshe wakes up Feluda and prevents them from becoming unconscious. Next day, Dhiru Kaka informs Inspector Gargari of the robbery. After lunch, Bonobihari Sarkar visits them and invites Feluda and Topshe to the Residency. While going to the Residency, Feluda informs Sarkar about "the spy" which was spoken by Pyarelal. In the Residency, someone tries to attack Feluda and Mr. Sarkar with stones.

Next day, Feluda and Topshe travel to Hazratganj, where they meet Mahavir in a book store. They go to coffee shop. Mahavir reveals to Feluda that his father used to get palpitations when he used to see any insect. He says that on the day of his father's death, his bearer tells that he had shouted very loudly.  Mahavir believes that there is a foul play is behind his father's death. They also meet Ganesh Guha. Ganesh tells that he has left Bonobihari's job and will return to Kolkata. Ganesh also warns Feluda that Bonobihari is not a very good man. Next day, Feluda, Topshe, Topshe's father, Bonobihari Babu, and Dr. Srivastav travel to Haridwar by the Doon Express. Before going to Haridwar, Feluda goes back to the Bhoolbhulaia.

In the train, Bonobihari questions Dr. Srivastav about Pyarelal. Dr. Srivastav realizes that Bonobihari is suspecting him of the robbery. Feluda tells that Dr. Srivastav is not the thief. In Hardoi station, while drinking tea, someone throws a paper at Feluda's direction. The paper contains the same warning - Be careful. Next morning, they reach Haridwar. After reaching the dharamshala, Feluda and Topshe travel to Har-ki-Pauri. While Feluda was lighting a cigarette, Topshe sees something shining. When questioned, Feluda says it is nothing but phosphorus. Topshe is not convinced. After returning to the dharamshala, they find Bonobihari talking with another Bengali man, Bilash Babu, who was an astrologer.

Later in the night, Feluda reveals to Topshe that he was the one who took the ring. He tells that there was someone who wanted to take the ring and that he wanted to catch him. Thus he hid the ring in one of the passages of the Bhoolbhulaia. Before coming to Haridwar, he went back to Bhoolbhulaia to recover the ring. Next morning, they travel to Laxmanjhoola. Feluda, Topshe and Bonobihari Babu travel in one taxi, while Topshe's father, Dr. Srivastav and Bilash Babu travel in another taxi. Topshe sees that a sadhu baba, who was following them from Lucknow, passed the taxi. Bonobihari Babu tells the driver to go down the forest on one side because he had news that there was a 12-foot python. They reach a loghouse.

In the loghouse, Bonobihari Babu asks Feluda to give him the ring. Bonobihari tells them that he recorded what they had talked last night. When Feluda enquires why, Bonobihari tells that he had bought the ring from Pyarelal Seth. Feluda tells that it never happened. What happened was this - Bonobihari wanted to take the ring. But Pyarelal did not want to part with it. So on the day of Pyarelal's death, Bonobihari took his dangerous Black Widow Spider and showed it to Pyarelal. Since Pyarelal had palpitations by seeing insects, he got a heart attack and died. Feluda reveals that the "spy" which Pyarelal uttered at the time of his death meant "spider", and his assistant Ganesh was following Dr. Srivastav from the day one. Ganesh was the one who threw warnings to Feluda and he was the one who threw stones at them at the Residency. The driver who was traveling with them today was actually Ganesh Guha. Angry, Bonobihari calls Ganesh and tells him to leave the rattle snake in the loghouse, while they will be escaping. Feluda throws the tin of toothpowder, which contained black pepper powder. Both Bonobihari and Ganesh fall down the house. Feluda shoots the snake dead, but Topshe becomes unconscious. Ganesh tries to escape but is shot by the sadhu, who actually Mahavir in disguise. Bilash Babu, who is actually Inspector Gorgori, arrests Bonobihari Sarkar and Ganesh Guha. Topshe regains consciousness and sees that Feluda is wearing the emperor Aurangzeb's ring.

Characters
 Pradosh Chandra Mitter aka. Feluda
 Tapesh Ranjan Mitter aka. Topshe
 Topshe's father
 Dhirendra Kumar Sanyal
 Dr. Srivastav
 Bonobihari Sarkar
 Ganesh Guha
 Pyarelal Seth
 Mahavir Seth
 Inspector Gargari

Adaptation

Badshahi Angti adapted into film in 2014. In this film actor Abir Chatterjee playing Feluda's character for first time.

References

External links
Bengali Film Badshahi Angti Review, Premiere Pics and Video; One of the Marvels of the Franchise

1969 novels
Feluda (series)
Novels by Satyajit Ray
Novels set in Lucknow
Indian novels adapted into films
1969 Indian novels
Cultural depictions of Aurangzeb